The 1902–03 Yale Bulldogs men's ice hockey season was the 8th season of play for the program.

Season
For the first time in five seasons, Yale was not the intercollegiate champion. A majority of Yale's games were played at the St. Nicholas Rink as it was one of the few available locations where consistent ice could be secured.

The team did not have a coach, however, Reeve Schley served as team manager.

Roster

Standings

Schedule and Results

|-
!colspan=12 style="color:white; background:#00356B" | Regular Season

References

Yale Bulldogs men's ice hockey seasons
Yale
Yale
Yale
Yale